Heinrich Neal (September 11, 1870 – 1940) was a German Kapellmeister at Heidelberg, born to the artist David Dalhoff Neal and Marie Ainmiller, and brother to dramatist Maximilian Dalhoff Neal.  His grandfather was the great glass painter Max Emanuel Ainmiller.

Heinrich graduated from the Munich Conservatory in 1888, then studied orchestral instrumentation at Dresden from 1889–1890, and in Paris from 1891–1893.  He, just as his father did, had duel citizenship in Germany as well as the U.S.  He married Alice Lessel on March 28, 1896 in Dresden, Germany.

Heinrich was the musical composer, who directed the Heidelberg Conservatory of Music, with his home address of Werder Strasse 7, Heidelberg, Germany.

His music includes many concert works  and chamber music notably:
"Opium" (a grad ballet)
"Sergeant Crespo" (a comic opera)
Hast du die Lippen mir wundgeküßt, op. 21 (Fünf Lieder) no. 5 (Text: Heinrich Heine)
Ich stand in dunkeln Träumen, op. 21 (Fünf Lieder) no. 4 (Text: Heinrich Heine)
Mir träumte von einem Königskind, op. 21 (Fünf Lieder) no. 3 (Text: Heinrich Heine)
String Quartet no.1, op. 54 in E major 
Invention No. 1 in C major, BWV 772, transcribed for 2 pianos [Müller Heidelberg]
Invention No. 6 in E major, BWV 777, transcribed for 2 pianos [Müller Heidelberg]
Invention No. 8 in F major, BWV 779, transcribed for 2 pianos [Müller Heidelberg]

Heinrich died a few months before his brother Max Neal died in the early years of the World War II.

References

External links
 

1870 births
1940 deaths
German composers
German people of American descent